David Mowbray Balme (8 September 1912 — 23 February 1989) was a British expatriate professor and scholar who became the first principal of the University College of the Gold Coast which is now University of Ghana. The Balme Library was named after him.

A banquet was held in his honour at the Commonwealth Hall of the university on the eve of his departure from Ghana. He was presented with an emblem of the university, a crowing cock carved in ivory, by the University Council. He left Ghana the next day to take up his new position as Reader in classics at Queen Mary's College, University of London.

Publication

References

External source
207 SQUADRON ROYAL AIR FORCE HISTORY -  DAVID MOWBRAY BALME By Allan Gotthelf

British expatriate academics
1912 births
1989 deaths
British expatriates in Ghana
Academic staff of the University of Ghana
Vice-Chancellors of the University of Ghana
Vice-Chancellors of universities in Ghana
Companions of the Distinguished Service Order
Recipients of the Distinguished Flying Cross (United Kingdom)
British World War II bomber pilots
Academics of Queen Mary University of London
Alumni of Clare College, Cambridge